Secondary stress (or obsolete: secondary accent) is the weaker of two degrees of stress in the pronunciation of a word, the stronger degree of stress being called primary. Another tradition in English is to assign acute and grave accents for primary and secondary stress, respectively: pronùnciátion.

Most languages have at most one degree of stress on the phonemic level (English is a notable exception according to some analyses). That is, each syllable has stress or it does not. Many languages have rhythmic stress; location of the stress may not be predictable, but when the location of one stressed syllable (which may be the primary stress) is known, certain syllables before or after can be predicted to also be stressed; these may have secondary stress. See . A similar rule applies in Romanian: secondary stress falls on every alternate syllable, starting with the first, as long as it does not fall adjacent to the primary stress. In other languages (including Egyptian Radio Arabic, Bhojpuri, Cayuga, Estonian, Hawaiian, Kaure, Malayalam, and Warrgamay), secondary stress can be predicted to fall on heavy syllables.

In other languages, the placement of secondary stress is not predictable, or may not be predictable (and thus be phonemic) for some words. This is frequently posited for Germanic languages, including English. For example, secondary stress is said to arise in compound words like vacuum cleaner, where the first syllable of vacuum has primary stress, while the first syllable of cleaner is usually said to have secondary stress. However, this analysis is problematic;  notes that these may be cases of full vs reduced unstressed vowels being interpreted as secondary stress vs unstressed. See Stress and vowel reduction in English for details.

In Norwegian, the pitch accent is lost from one of the roots in a compound word, but the erstwhile tonic syllable retains the full length (long vowel or geminate consonant) of a stressed syllable; this has sometimes been characterized as secondary stress.

See also
 Pausa

Notes

Bibliography

Phonology
Phonetics
Stress (linguistics)